The 60th United States Colored Infantry was a U.S.C.T. infantry regiment in the Union Army during the American Civil War. The regiment was composed of African American enlisted men commanded by white officers and was authorized by the Bureau of Colored Troops which was created by the United States War Department on May 22, 1863.

Service
The 60th U.S. Colored Infantry was organized from the 1st Iowa Infantry (colored) in March 1864 and served in various garrison duties in the Department of Arkansas assigned to the VII Corps (Union Army) for its entire service.

On July 26, 1864, near Wallace's Ferry in Arkansas, elements of the 60th  and 56th Colored Infantry regiments and Battery E of the 2nd U.S. Colored Artillery were attacked by a superior force of Confederate cavalry commanded by Col. Archibald S. Dobbins.  Supported by about 150 men from the 15th Illinois Cavalry the infantry regiments organized a fighting retreat and at a crucial moment in the battle made a counter charge into the enemy line. The Union regiments made their way back to Helena. The 60th Regiment did not report any casualties from the battle but Union casualties in the other units were 19 killed, 40 wounded, and 4 missing. Confederate losses are unknown.

The 60th U.S. Colored Regiment was mustered out of service on October 15, 1865.

Commanders
 Colonel John G. Hudson

See also
List of United States Colored Troops Civil War Units

Notes

Sources
Civil War Archives
Encyclopedia of Arkansas History

United States Colored Troops Civil War units and formations
Military units and formations established in 1864
1864 establishments in Iowa
Military units and formations disestablished in 1865